Delev (Bulgarian: Делев) is a Bulgarian masculine surname, its feminine counterpart is Deleva. Notable people with the surname include:

Nikola Delev (born 1925), Bulgarian cross-country skier
Spas Delev (born 1989), Bulgarian footballer

Bulgarian-language surnames